Stavros Kazantzidis is a Greek-Australian writer, director and producer.

Achievements
Kazantzidis's film career was kick-started in 1992, when Road to Alice, a short film he both wrote and directed, won 'Best Short Film' at the Australian Film Institute Awards. He was also the winner of 'Young Filmmaker of the Year' at the Edinburgh International Film Festival  in the same year. He wrote, directed and produced Love & Other Catastrophes, the international hit, which was nominated for 'Best Film' in 1996 in the Australian Film Institute Award. In 2000, Kazantzidis's film Russian Doll went on to be the winner of 'Best Original Screenplay' in the Australian Film Institute Awards.

Filmography
Horseplay' (2003) In the Cut (2003)Russian Doll (2000)Strange Planet (1999)True Love & Chaos (1997)Love & Other Catastrophes (1996)Road to Alice'' (1990)

Education
Kazantzidis acquired his Bachelor in Visual Arts from the University of Sydney in 1988, during which he was the President of the student union. He followed that with a certification in Production Design in 1989, before going on to acquire a Bachelor in Film and Television, both from the Australian Film, Television and Radio School AFTRS.

Work Experience
Stavros Kazanzidis, together with Allanah Zitserman, was key to the inception of the Dungog Film Festival, which aims to "foster a greater appreciation for Australian films amongst Australian audiences, strengthen bonds within the Australian film and television communities, and present a cultural experience in a distinctly Australian rural setting". He has been the managing director of the annual Dungog Film Festival since 2007.

References

Year of birth missing (living people)
Living people
Australian film directors
Greek film directors
Australian people of Greek descent